The Pilkington, later Milborne-Swinnerton-Pilkington Baronetcy, of Stanley in the County of York, is a title in the Baronetage of Nova Scotia. The fifth Baronet was High Sheriff of Yorkshire for 1740–41 and sat as member of parliament for Horsham. The eighth Baronet married Mary, daughter and co-heir of Thomas Swinnerton, of Butterton Hall, Staffordshire, by his wife Mary, daughter and heir of Charles Milborne, of Wonastow Court, Monmouthshire. His second son William changed his name to Milborne-Swinnerton by Act of Parliament, but later resumed the use of the surname of Pilkington in addition to Milborne-Swinnerton by another Act of Parliament (which partially revoked the first act). Similarly, Sir William Pilkington's youngest son Lionel, the eleventh Baronet, assumed in 1856 by Royal licence the surname of Milborne-Swinnerton, but later resumed the surname of Pilkington in addition to those of Milborne-Swinnerton by Act of Parliament. He was High Sheriff of Yorkshire for 1859–60.

Pilkington, later Milborne-Swinnerton-Pilkington baronets, of Stanley (1635)
Sir Arthur Pilkington, 1st Baronet (died 1650)
Sir Lyon Pilkington, 2nd Baronet (1613–1684)
Sir Lyon Pilkington, 3rd Baronet (–1714)
Sir Lyon Pilkington, 4th Baronet (1683–1716)
Sir Lionel Pilkington, 5th Baronet (1707–1778)
Sir Michael Pilkington, 6th Baronet (1715–1788)
Sir Thomas Pilkington, 7th Baronet (1773–1811)
Sir William Pilkington, 8th Baronet (1775–1850)
Sir Thomas Edward Pilkington, 9th Baronet (1829–1854)
Sir William Milborne-Swinnerton-Pilkington, 10th Baronet (1831–1855)
Sir Lionel Milborne-Swinnerton-Pilkington, 11th Baronet (1835–1901)
Sir Thomas Edward Milborne-Swinnerton-Pilkington, 12th Baronet (1857–1944)
Sir Arthur William Milborne-Swinnerton-Pilkington, 13th Baronet (1898–1952)
Sir Thomas Henry Milborne-Swinnerton-Pilkington, 14th Baronet (born 1934).

The heir to the title is the 14th Baronet's son, Richard Milborne-Swinnerton-Pilkington (b 4 Sept 1964).

References

Kidd, Charles, Williamson, David (editors). Debrett's Peerage and Baronetage (1990 edition). New York: St Martin's Press, 1990.

Milborne-Swinnerton-Pilkington
1635 establishments in Nova Scotia